Coleophora squamosella is a moth of the family Coleophoridae. It is found in Europe (from Great Britain to Poland and Hungary and from Fennoscandia to France, Italy and Austria), the Baltic states, the Caucasus, Russia (Baikal and Altai) and Turkey.

The wingspan is 11–13 mm. Adults are on wing in June and July.

The larvae feed in a case on Erigeron species, including Erigeron acer.

References

External links
 Lepiforum.de

squamosella
Moths described in 1856
Moths of Asia
Moths of Europe
Taxa named by Henry Tibbats Stainton